

Events
 Retired Emperor Go-Saga orders a new imperial anthology of Japanese waka poetry. It will be completed in 1265 by     Fujiwara no Tameie, with assistance from Fujiwara no Motoie, Fujiwara no Ieyoshi, Fujiwara no Yukiee, and Fujiwara no Mitsutoshi and titled Shokukokin Wakashū (続古今和歌集, "Collection of Ancient and Modern Times Continued"), consisting of twenty volumes containing 1,925 poems.

Works published

Births

Deaths
 Óláfr Þórðarson (born 1210), Icelandic skald
 Jehan Erart (born 1200), trouvère

13th-century poetry
Poetry